This is a list of wineries in the McLaren Vale wine region, a major wine-producing region located within the Fleurieu wine zone in South Australia. There are an estimated 74 cellar doors and over 160 vineyards in the region.

The wineries are centred around five main areas: Currency Creek, Old Reynella, McLaren Vale, McLaren Flat, Willunga and Aldinga.

Currency Creek wineries 
 One Paddock Currency Creek Winery

Aldinga wineries 
 Cradle of Hills
 Dyson Wines
 Sellicks Hill Wines
 Big Easy Radio

McLaren Flat wineries 
 Australian Boutique Premium Wines
 DogRidge Wines
 Gemtree Vineyards
 Graham Stevens Wines
 Hugo Wines
 Kangarilla Road Winery
 Lavina Wines
 Mr. Riggs Wine Company
 Parri Estate
 Possums Wines
 Scarpantonni Estate Wines
 Shottesbrooke Vineyards
 Woodstock Estate
 Yangarra Estate
 Zonte's Footstep

McLaren Vale wineries 
 Alpha Box and Dice Wines
 Angove Winery
 Beach Road Wines
 Bekker's Wine
 Bondar Wines
 Brash Higgins Wine Co
 Brick Kiln
 Chalk Hill Wines
 Chapel Hill
 Conte Estate Wines
 Coriole Vineyards
 Curtis Winery
 d'Arenberg
 Dandelion Vineyards
 Dennis Wines
 Dodgy Brothers Wines
 Dowie Doole Wines
 Dub Style Wines
 Ekhidna Wines
 Foggo Wines
 Fork in the Road Wines
 Fox Creek Wines
 Hugh Hamilton Wines
 Inkwell Wines
 Ivybrook Farm
 J & J Wines
 Kay Brothers Amery
 Leconfield Wines
 Lino Ramble
 Lloyd Brothers Wine
 Maximus Winers
 Maxwell Wines
 McLaren Vale Winemakers
 McLaren Vale III Associates
 Nick Haselgrove Wines
 Noon Winery
 Oliverhill Winery
 Olivers Taranga
 Paxton Wines
 Penny's Hill
 Pertaringa Wines
 Pirramimma Winers
 Primo Estate
 Price's Wines
 Primo Estate
 Rosemount Wines
 Samuel's Gorge
 SC Pannell
 Serafino Wines
 Shingleback Wines
 Tintara
 Waywood Wines
 White Feather Red
 Wirra Wirra Vineyards

Old Reynella wineries 
 Geoff Merrill Wines

Willunga wineries 
 Ashley Hills Estate
 Battle of Bosworth Wines
 Fleurieu Hills Vineyard
 Hampshire Vineyard
 Hither & Yon
 Linger Longer Vineyard
 Magpie Springs
 Minko Wines
Ortus Wines
 Willunga Creek Wines
 Zimmermann Wines

See also

 South Australian wine
 List of wineries in South Australia
 List of wineries in the Barossa Valley
 List of wineries in the Clare Valley
 List of wineries in the Eden Valley

References

McLaren Vale
Wineries in McLaren Vale
McLaren